Christ's Commission Fellowship (CCF) is a non-denominational church founded by Dr. Peter Tan-Chi, based in the Philippines. Its main worship church is located at the CCF Center in Ortigas East (formerly Frontera Verde), Pasig.

History
In 1982, Pastor Peter Tan-Chi began an evangelistic home Bible study in Brookside Subdivision, Cainta, Rizal. Only three couples attended that first Bible study, but as they began to invite their friends, who then invited their own friends and families, the Bible study grew and moved to San Juan City. Two years later, a core group of 40 people (businessmen, professionals, and their families) emerged from these Bible studies. Later on, they met at the Asian Institute of Management for their first Sunday worship service and launched "Christ's Commission Foundation" in August 1984.

Since then, CCF's continuous growth has caused its worship services to move from place to place. From AIM, services moved to Greenbelt in Makati, then to the Conference Room of the Philippine International Convention Center, and then to the PICC Plenary Hall. Worshippers then split in order to attend at a venue in CCF Sucat, and one at the Valle Verde Country Club.

In 1997, CCF's worship services transferred to St. Francis Square in Ortigas Center.

On 12 May 2013, CCF held its first Sunday worship service at the new CCF Center in Frontera Verde in Pasig, with a 10,000 seating capacity.

In 2016, the church was chosen by the Dangerous Drugs Board (a government agency in the Philippines) to offer a spiritual rehabilitation program for drug addicts.

In 2019, CCF has over 100,000 members and 70 satellites in the Philippines alone. CCF has satellite churches and small groups in other parts of the world, including North America, Australia, the Middle East, and Asia. CCF has also helped form over 600 small groups in East Asia and over 12,000 house churches and small groups in South Asia.

In 2020, the Pasig Church had 55,000 people.

Exalt Worship
In 2019, Exalt Worship released their first major album, Majestic, consisting of seven songs. This was followed by releases of new singles such as "King Jesus" and "Joy".

Gallery

See also

List of the largest evangelical churches
List of the largest evangelical church auditoriums
Worship service (evangelicalism)

References

External links 

Christ's Commission Fellowship CCF's Official Website
 CCF's Official Youtube Channel

Evangelical denominations in Asia
Christian denominations in Asia
Pentecostalism in Asia
Christian organizations established in 1984
1984 establishments in the Philippines
Churches in Metro Manila
Evangelical megachurches in the Philippines